Pelodytidae, also known as the parsley frogs, or rarely, mud divers, is a family of frogs. It contains a single extant genus, Pelodytes, and two genera only known from fossils. The extant species are found in southwestern Europe and the Caucasus.

Genera
 Pelodytes Bonaparte, 1838 – 5 species, southwestern Europe and the Caucasus
 †Miopelodytes Taylor, 1941 – 1 species, North America
 †Tephrodytes Henrici, 1994 – 1 species, North America

Evolutionary relationships
Most recent studies suggests that Pelodytidae belongs to a clade containing three other families: Pelobatidae, Scaphiopodidae, and Megophryidae. Its sister taxon is the clade Pelobatidae+Megophryidae, although older studies have suggested also other relationships.

Description
The eyes have rounded but vertically oriented pupils. The finger and the toe tips are blunt to pointed. The tadpoles have keratinized mouthparts. The family is also characterized by a number of anatomical and sceletal features, including the fusion of the tibiale and fibulare that have been used to include the fossil taxa Miopelodytes and Tephrodytes in this family.

References

 
Amphibian families
Extant Eocene first appearances
Taxa named by Charles Lucien Bonaparte